River Town: Two Years on the Yangtze is a 2001 book by Peter Hessler. It documents his Peace Corps teaching assignment at Fuling Teachers College in Fuling, Sichuan, which started in 1996 and lasted for two years; Fuling is now part of Chongqing municipality.

Style
The book is a memoir of his experience in Fuling, told in first person. The language used is deliberately informal and aims to convey the beauty of the city and the poignancy of the stories. One of the features of the book is that most of its chapters can be read out of order without confusion. Most characters only appear inside a single chapter — or a few contiguous chapters — while just a few main characters appear throughout the book.

The main characters are: 
Adam, Peter's foreign friend
Teacher Liao and Teacher Kong, who will teach Peter Chinese
Anne, one of Peter's brightest students

The author uses many Chinese terms (normally romanized) to refer to common things or people, to make them look more typical of Chinese culture. For instance, foreigners are often referred to as waiguoren, girls are called xiaojies, porters are called stick-stick soldiers (translated literally from the Sichuanese term 棒棒军 bàngbàngjūn), and so on.

Each chapter includes a short annex which describes Fuling's most notable places in the present tense, whilst normal chapters are set in the past and use the past simple, present perfect and past perfect tenses.

It is common to find excerpts from writing assignments given to Chinese students. Those short pieces and excerpts are pregnant with their stories, feelings and thoughts, that help the reader (as the author before) to discover hidden private stories about Chinese life.

The goal of the book partly seems to be to recount the author's experience in Fuling, but mostly it seems to be aimed at telling the locals' stories inside the setting of the author's life in Fuling. Many stories are heavy with poignancy: for instance, the priest of the Fuling Catholic Church, 李海若 (Li Hǎiruò) has a beautiful innocence and a poignant past. Moving stories are also those of some of his students, who came from deprived peasant homes in Sichuan countryside and tried to deal with a tough schooling system. Some of his students (mostly women) had abortions or committed suicide. The author manages to go over the "unemotional veneer" that the Chinese presented to the outside world and discover real China.

Environment
Fuling was very different from now in the two-year period 1996-1998. There were no streets and highways, and the life, the schooling system as well as the working conditions and salaries were worse than now. History also plays a role in the narrative, when Deng Xiaoping's death and the Handover of Hong Kong (1997) give the author the chance to exchange opinions with the locals and participate in the celebration of those events.

The university
The campus where Peter Hessler was teaching was called Fuling Teachers College and it used to be a college for teachers. As shown on the map found in the book, it was located in Jiangdong area at that time. The Jiangdong campus then became Yangtze Normal University and eventually it was shut down. Now it serves as a dormitory for the elderly. Nowadays, Fuling Teachers College, together with Yangtze Normal University, is located in the newly built Lidu (李渡镇) neighborhood.

Reception
The book won the Kiriyama Prize and it has also been a New York Times Notable Book.
Marlene Chamberlain of Booklist concluded that "This is a colorful memoir from a Peace Corps volunteer who came away with more understanding of the Chinese than any foreign traveler has a right to expect."

See also
White Crane Ridge

References

Bibliography

 

2001 non-fiction books
Chinese memoirs
Books about China
English-language education
Peace Corps
Chongqing
Sichuan